Extended Play for the Eastern Hemisphere is a 5-song EP that was released by the band Dredg and Universal Music Group: EU, in 2001.

Content
The EP contains the exclusive 2001 mix of "Of the Room", as well as tracks from Leitmotif & an enhanced CD section with a video gallery.

This was released only in Europe.

Track listing

Dredg albums
2002 EPs